A footlight is a theatrical lighting device.

Footlight may also refer to:

 Footlights, an amateur theatrical club based in Cambridge, England; and
 Footlight (typeface), a serif typeface